Rui Pedro is a given name. Notable people with the name include:

Rui Duarte (footballer, born 1978) (born 1978), Portuguese footballer
Rui Pedro (footballer, born 1988), Portuguese footballer
Rui Pedro (footballer, born 1998), Portuguese footballer
Rui Pedro (futsal player) (born 1993), Portuguese futsal player
Rui Pedro Teixeira Mendonça (born 1987), missing boy